Desiree Akhavan (born December 27, 1984) is an American filmmaker, writer and actress. She is best known for her 2014 feature film debut Appropriate Behavior, and her 2018 film The Miseducation of Cameron Post. She appeared in the found footage horror film Creep 2.

Early life and education
Akhavan was born in New York City in 1984. Both of Akhavan's parents fled to the United States following the Iranian Revolution in 1979; Akhavan has stated in interviews that they now identify as American. Her father has not returned to Iran since the 1980s, though Akhavan occasionally visited family overseas as a child. As a child, Akhavan lived in New Jersey before her family moved to Rockland County, New York. As a commuting student, Akhavan attended the Horace Mann School, an independent prep school in The Bronx, for her high school years. During this period of time, Akhavan struggled with feelings of loneliness: "My life was in New York City but I would sleep in the suburbs and I didn’t know anyone there. I didn’t have friends and I didn’t have a life, other than watching television and movies."

Akhavan has attributed her first experiences with American culture through watching TV shows and films. She began writing plays when she was 10 years old and began acting in plays at 13 years old.

Akhavan struggled to fit in at school, with negative body images and standards leading her to face eating disorders such as bulimia. "There was one aesthetic, and it was: very thin, very petite, straight hair, straight nose, Petit Bateau T-shirt, 7 For All Mankind jeans, North Face fleece” – but these things take their toll. “I know those girls who fit in at that age, and it was through a sexual power that they couldn’t handle. Power is a really tricky thing, it’s overwhelming. If men had paid attention to me at that age, I would have gotten in trouble.” 

Akhavan studied Film and Theatre at Smith College, a women's college in Northampton, Massachusetts, where she was "a bit of a loner". After graduating in 2007, she studied film directing as a graduate student at New York University's Tisch School of the Arts. She also spent a year studying abroad at Queen Mary, University of London.

Career
Akhavan made her first short film Two Drink Minimum while studying in London as a graduate student. In 2010, she wrote and directed the short film Nose Job.

Akhavan has regularly appeared in her own work following her writing, directing, and acting in the lesbian-themed web series The Slope. She and Ingrid Jungermann, her creative partner, were named to Filmmakers 25 New Faces of Independent Film in 2012. The series premiered in 2011.

She plays a writing student in Season 4 of Girls. The role was offered to her after Lena Dunham and Jenni Konner saw her film Appropriate Behaviour.

In 2014, Akhavan's film Appropriate Behavior, in which she plays an alternative version of herself, premiered at the Sundance Film Festival. The film was first written as her senior thesis paper as a graduate student at New York University. Although it is inspired by personal events in Akhavan's life, such as the break up of her first lesbian relationship, she has asserted that the film is not autobiographical. That year, she was also selected for the Sundance Institute's Episodic Story Lab for her pilot script Switch Hitter.

In 2015, Akhavan was the President of the Queer Palm jury at the 2015 Cannes Film Festival.

She has stated she draws inspiration from people such as Todd Solondz and Noah Baumbach.

Channel 4 commissioned a sitcom called The Bisexual to be written, directed by and starring Akhavan. It aired on October 10, 2018 in the U.K. and on November 16, 2018 in the U.S. The sitcom explores misconceptions of bisexuality. In an interview with UK's Bazaar, she said, "To me that was the perfect way to handle bisexuality, through the lens of a lesbian."

In November 2016, it was announced Akhavan would write, direct and produce The Miseducation of Cameron Post, starring Chloë Grace Moretz, and Sasha Lane. The critically acclaimed film won the 2018 Grand Jury Prize at the Sundance Film Festival, and was officially selected for the 2018 Tribeca Film Festival, Seattle International Film Festival, Toronto LGBT Film Festival, San Francisco International LGBTQ Film Festival, Outfest, and the San Francisco Indie Film Festival, earning multiple additional nominations and awards.

In an interview about her career with The Guardian, Akhavan proclaimed, "The only mainstream queer female stories have been directed by men-it disgusts me." In the same interview, Akhavan explains her intentions behind directing The Miseducation of Cameron Post. "I didn’t want it to be propaganda, though I think that would be a more commercially successful film. I wanted the tone to be right… Every film about teens is really about the moment they realise that none of the adults know what they’re doing.” 

On November 17, 2018, Akhavan attended the Vulture Festival, speaking at a sit-down conversation alongside actresses Chloë Grace Moretz and Tatum O’Neal to discuss working in the film industry.

Currently, Akhavan is working on a memoir, Late Bloomer, a collection of personal essays, to be published in 2020.

In the same interview, Akhavan talks about her struggles as a female filmmaker in Late Bloomer, and she refers to herself as an “unattractive," “lonely,” and “very awkward teenager.”

Activism 
Desiree Akhavan is an activist in advocating the LGBTQ culture in film industry. She recounted in an interview that when she pitched The Bisexual to networks in Los Angeles in 2015, she "was rejected everywhere.” She stated the rejection was “because Americans are terrified of female sexuality,” on Twitter. Her work has put the queer female stories forefront among the other male-lead stories, such as in her films The Miseducation of Cameron Post, The Bisexual, and Appropriate Behaviour.

After doing well at Sundance, The Miseducation of Cameron Post had trouble finding a distributor, which Akhavan contributes to the evident sexism in the industry. “Very few women have won the Sundance award, and it’s not escaping me that the one film that’s about female sexuality, directed by a woman, is having a harder time getting out there,” she says. "Things are changing in the industry, but female-driven stories, specifically sexually driven female stories, are very difficult. If there is sex in the film, it has to be a man’s pleasure.”

Like many, Akhavan is calling for change in the film industry.  "There’s clearly something toxic in this industry, a place where women are paid a quarter of what the men are paid for the exact same job. Clearly there’s something diseased here. And now maybe we’ll see that the work won’t suffer because of this, that it will become exciting and diverse and tell stories we haven’t heard before."

When Akhavan was asked about the future of queer TV in her interview with Bazaar, she said, “There’s less of a separatist feeling the way we had at the time The L Word was being produced, so I think more queer subject matter is inching its way into mainstream television.”

In June 2019, to mark the 50th anniversary of the Stonewall riots, an event widely considered a watershed moment in the modern LGBTQ rights movement, Queerty named her one of the Pride50 "trailblazing individuals who actively ensure society remains moving towards equality, acceptance and dignity for all queer people".

Personal life
Akhavan identifies herself as a bisexual woman and a Brooklynite. She often explores her bisexuality within her work. She has talked about how she and her family are from Iran, where it is illegal to be gay. She currently lives in Brooklyn, New York. She has a brother who is a pediatric urologist.

Filmography

Film

Television

Web

Personal television appearances

Awards and nominations

See also
 List of female film and television directors
 List of LGBT-related films directed by women
 LGBT culture in New York City
 List of LGBT people from New York City

References

External links

Actresses from New York City
Actresses of Iranian descent
American film actresses
Television producers from New York City
American women television producers
American web series actresses
American women film directors
American women screenwriters
American writers of Iranian descent
Bisexual women
Bisexual screenwriters
Bisexual actresses
LGBT film directors
American bisexual actors
LGBT people from New York (state)
American LGBT screenwriters
American emigrants to England
Living people
Tisch School of the Arts alumni
Smith College alumni
Writers from New York City
21st-century American actresses
1984 births
Iranian diaspora film people
Film directors from New York City
Screenwriters from New York (state)
21st-century American women writers
Sundance Film Festival award winners
American expatriates in England
American bisexual writers